The Space Between is the second studio album by Canadian R&B duo Majid Jordan, released on October 27, 2017, by OVO Sound and Warner Bros. Records. It features guest appearances from OVO label-mates PartyNextDoor and Dvsn. The album's production was handled primarily by Majid Jordan, alongside Nineteen85 and Stargate.

Background
On July 31, 2017, Majid Jordan took to Instagram to announce the album. The tracklist was revealed on October 17, 2017.

Singles
The lead single, "Phases", was released on April 28, 2017. The second single, "One I Want", featuring OVO label-mate PartyNextDoor, was released on June 15, 2017. The third and final single, "My Imagination", featuring another OVO label-mate Dvsn, was released on September 28, 2017.

Promotion

Tour
On January 1, 2018, Majid Jordan announced an official headlining concert tour to further promote the album, titled The Space Between Tour. The tour began on January 16, 2018 in Montreal, at M Telus.

Critical reception
The Space Between received positive reviews from critics. Briana Younger from Pitchfork said, "The writing is simple but effective; the productions are intricate but subtly propulsive. There is plenty that can stand alone here, but the album is best consumed all the way through, present and unhurried." Yasin Rahman from Exclaim stated, "The Space Between is enjoyable and interesting. Majid Jordan haven't strayed too far from their typical formula, but keep things interesting for their fans with introspective lyrics and new sounds."

Track listing
Credits were adapted from Tidal.

Personnel
Credits were adapted from Tidal.Performers Majid Jordan – primary artist
 PartyNextDoor – featured artist 
 Dvsn – featured artist Technical Chris Athens – mastering engineer 
 Noel "Gadget" Campbell – mixing engineer 
 Harley Arsenault – assistant mixing engineer 
 Noah "40" Shebib – assistant mixing engineer 
 Jordan Ullman – recording engineer 
 Erik Sist – assistant recording engineer 
 Greg Moffett – assistant recording engineer 
 Thomas Warren – recording engineer 
 Mikkel Eriksen – recording engineer 
 Josh Florez – recording engineer Production Jordan Ullman – producer 
 Stargate – producer  
 Majid Jordan – producer 
 Nineteen85 – producer Managerial'
 Cate Wright – A&R Administration
 Mr. Morgan – A&R Coordination

Charts

References

2017 albums
Majid Jordan albums
OVO Sound albums
Warner Records albums
Albums produced by Majid Jordan
Albums produced by Nineteen85